Sir Arnold Lawson (4 December 1867 - 19 January 1947), was a British ophthalmologist. During the First World War he was on the list of honorary consultants at King Edward VII's Hospital for Officers, drawn up by Sister Agnes in 1914.  He was responsible for blinded servicemen at St Dunstan's Hospital for Blinded Soldiers and Sailors.

References

1867 births
1947 deaths
20th-century British medical doctors